Mondell is a surname. Notable people with the surname include:

Frank Wheeler Mondell (1860–1939), United States Representative from Wyoming
Anthony Mondell (1916–2009), Academy Award-nominated art director
 Allen Mondell and Cynthia Salzman Mondell, directors of the 2009 film A Reason to Live